Biology is the scientific study of life, also referred to as biosciences.

Biology may also refer to:

 Biology: The Unity and Diversity of Life, a college-level textbook compiled by Cecie Starr and Ralph Taggart
 Biology (textbook), a textbook by Neil Campbell, first published in 1987
 Miller & Levine Biology, a textbook by Kenneth R. Miller and Joseph Levine
 Biology (journal), a scientific journal published by MDPI
 Biology (band), an American rock/indie band
 "Biology" (song), a 2005 song by Girls Aloud
 "Biology", an American jazz song sung by Sue Raney
"Biology", a song by Jane Child from Jane Child

See also
 Biologicals, a peer-reviewed journal